Kevin Morris (born c. 1962) is an American football coach and former player. He is was most recently the offensive coordinator at the University of Pennsylvania.  He was formerly the head football coach at the University of Massachusetts Amherst, a position he held from 2009 through November 21, 2011.  Morris served as the head football coach at Worcester Polytechnic Institute from 1993 to 1998.

Head coaching record

*UMass' conference record is listed as 0–0 because they were in the process of transitioning to FBS.

References

External links
 Penn profile
 UMass profile

1960s births
Living people
American football quarterbacks
Albany Great Danes football coaches
Monmouth Hawks football coaches
Northeastern Huskies football coaches
Penn Quakers football coaches
Stony Brook Seawolves football coaches
UMass Minutemen football coaches
Union Dutchmen football coaches
Williams Ephs baseball players
Williams Ephs football players
WPI Engineers football coaches
Yale Bulldogs football coaches
Sportspeople from Hampshire County, Massachusetts